The 1961 Football League Cup Final was the inaugural League Cup final. It was contested by Rotherham United and Aston Villa over two legs. Aston Villa won 3–2 on aggregate.

Due to fixture congestion, the second leg was not played until after the start of the 1961–62 season. As a result, Villa began their defence of the trophy just eight days after winning it. Though all League clubs were eligible to participate, Arsenal, Sheffield Wednesday, Tottenham Hotspur, West Bromwich Albion and Wolverhampton Wanderers did not enter. The prize money for winning the competition was £750. The two clubs would not play each other again until they met in the same competition in August 2013. Both clubs received first round byes.

Players and officials

First leg

Second leg

Road to the final

Aston Villa

References

First leg from Soccerbase
Second leg from Soccerbase

League Cup Final
EFL Cup Finals
League Cup Final 1961
League Cup Final 1961
1960–61 Football League
August 1961 sports events in the United Kingdom
September 1961 sports events in the United Kingdom
1960s in Birmingham, West Midlands